Syrphipogon is a subgenus of the hoverfly genus Microdon. There are two known species. They are very large microdontine flies of about 25 mm. They have a deeply sulcate scutellum and a facial mystax. They are mimics of the large bees of the genus Eulaema.

Distribution
They are native to the Neotropics.

Species
There are two species described in Syrphipogon:
M. fucatissimus (Hull, 1937)
M. gaigei Steyskal, 1953

References

Insect subgenera
Microdontinae
Diptera of South America